San Jose may refer to the following places in the U.S. state of New Mexico:

San Jose, Rio Arriba County, New Mexico, a census-designated place
San Jose, San Miguel County, New Mexico, a census-designated place